The Kangjia language is a recently discovered Mongolic language spoken by a Muslim population of around 300 people in Jainca (Jianzha) County, Huangnan Tibetan Autonomous Prefecture in Qinghai province of China. As to its taxonomic affiliation, Kangjia seems to be an intermediate between Bonan language and Dongxiang language (Santa).

Phonology 
Kangjia has nine vowels.

References

Citations

Sources

External links 
  The Website of China's Minority Language Studies (中国民族语言研究网) 

Agglutinative languages
Southern Mongolic languages
Languages of China
Severely endangered languages
Mongolic languages